
Lago di Vogorno is a reservoir near Tenero, in Ticino, Switzerland. The reservoir on the Verzasca river is formed by the Verzasca Dam, built 1961–1965.

See also
List of lakes of Switzerland

External links

Lakes of Ticino
Reservoirs in Switzerland